Captain Edward Denman Clarke  (21 May 1898 – 5 September 1966) was a World War I flying ace. Although he was credited with six aerial victories, he was granted a Military Cross for his valour in a ground attack mission.

In later life, Clarke was made a Commander of the Order of the British Empire as the managing director of the aviation and shipping corporation Saunders-Roe.

Early life
Edward Denman Clarke was born on 21 May 1898 in the Grand Duchy of Finland, where his St Petersburg-based family had a hunting lodge. He was educated at Eton College.

World War I

Clarke joined the Royal Flying Corps in early 1916, being confirmed in the rank of second lieutenant on 19 May. On 21 August, he was appointed a flying officer and was posted to No. 45 Squadron RFC.

He was promoted to lieutenant on 1 August 1917, and scored six aerial victories between 23 August and 20 October.

He was shot down by ground fire on 26 October 1917, as he strafed enemy positions from his Sopwith Camel during the Battle of Passchendaele. His courage on that occasion earned him a Military Cross. The accompanying award citation, gazetted 23 April 1918, told the tale:

"For conspicuous gallantry and devotion to duty. He has shot down five enemy machines. In an attack he repeatedly dived to within fifty feet of the enemy infantry, firing between 500 and 600 rounds. Though struck by a piece of shell, which wounded him in both arms and shattered both petrol tanks, he succeeded in gliding back behind our lines."

On 1 August 1918 he was appointed temporary captain. On 31 January 1919, Clarke relinquished his commission in the Royal Air Force.

Aerial victories

Post war
He married first Audrey Rant with whom he had two sons, Larry and Peter, and a daughter Valerie . He later married Maureen Cowie Leitch.

On 31 May 1956, Clarke was honoured with the award of Commander of the Order of the British Empire; at the time, he was the managing director of Saunders-Roe Ltd., Cowes, Isle of Wight.

Clarke died on 5 September 1966.

References
Notes

Bibliography
 

1898 births
1966 deaths
People educated at Eton College
British chief executives
British World War I flying aces
Recipients of the Military Cross
Commanders of the Order of the British Empire
Place of birth missing
Place of death missing